Titans is a Canadian docudrama series produced for the 1981/82 season by CBC and Citytv (Titans Television Limited). The premise features staged interviews involving Patrick Watson and an actor who portrays a historical figure, conceptually similar to Watson's earlier series, Witness to Yesterday.

The program began as a summer series on CBC Television starting 3 July 1981. The initial run ended 25 September 1981. A second run of the series aired from 18 April to 22 August 1982.

Guest actors 
Following are some of the historical persons featured in the series, with the actors who portrayed them:
 Napoleon – David Calderisi
 Nefertiti – Marilyn Lightstone
 Galileo – Chris Wiggins
 Queen Elizabeth I – Frances Hyland
 Stephen Leacock – W. O. Mitchell
 Nostradamus – Len Birman
 Confucius – John Neville
 Albert Einstein – John Marley
 Billy Bishop – Cedric Smith
 George Sand – Andrea Martin
 Alexander Graham Bell – Patrick Watson

See also
 Meeting of Minds – a similar interview series produced by Steve Allen

References

External links
 TVArchive.ca: Titans
 

1981 Canadian television series debuts
1982 Canadian television series endings
CBC Television original programming
Citytv original programming
English-language television shows
1980s Canadian drama television series
Canadian television docudramas